Best Hit AKG is a compilation album by the Japanese rock band Asian Kung-Fu Generation, released on January 18, 2012.

History
Best Hit AKG is the band's first compilation album. Song selection was determined by members other than Masafumi Goto. The album includes all of their singles up until this point with the exception of "Siren", "World Apart" and "Maigoinu to Ame no Beat".

Limited edition includes bonus DVD of "Return To The Basics vol.1". Live studio recording of the songs from the 1st album "Kimi Tsunagi Five M" are included here in the same order.

Gotoh announced via Twitter that the compilation did not represent the end of the band, and that they still planned to release an original album in the summer of 2012. This became Landmark.

This album is also their first to be available for digital download in the United States via iTunes.

Track listing

Personnel
Masafumi Gotoh – lead vocals, guitar, lyrics
Kensuke Kita – lead guitar, background vocals
Takahiro Yamada –  bass, background vocals
Kiyoshi Ijichi – drums
Asian Kung-Fu Generation – producer

References
 CDJapan

Asian Kung-Fu Generation albums
2012 compilation albums
Japanese-language compilation albums
Sony Music compilation albums